Garakupi High School is a higher secondary school located at Garakupi. Garakupi itself is a small village of North 24 Parganas district in the state of West Bengal, India, near Basirhat town but specially under Hasnabad (community development block).

Facility
Garakupi High School has a facility rating of 2.71 out of 5. It has fairly good access to infrastructure, including water, electricity, Internet, and other resources compared to other schools in West Bengal.

General info
This is co-education school for Secondary and higher education level students. There are around 900 students enrolled at this school, making it a fairly large school in India.

The extracurricular activities have at Garakupi High School than at other smaller schools in West Bengal. Pupil-teachers ratio for secondary school is just about the average that well balanced pupil-teacher interaction and decent.

Affiliation
Garakupi High School is affiliated with West Bengal Board of Secondary Education and West Bengal Council of Higher Secondary Education

References

External links

High schools and secondary schools in West Bengal
Schools in North 24 Parganas district
Educational institutions established in 1965
1965 establishments in West Bengal